All I Want (also known as Try Seventeen) is a 2002 coming-of-age comedy-drama film directed by Jeffrey Porter and written by Charles Kephart. It stars Elijah Wood, Franka Potente and Mandy Moore. The film premiered at the Toronto International Film Festival on September 10, 2002 and Palm Springs International Film Festival on January 12, 2003.

Premise
After 17-year-old misfit Jones Dillon drops out of college on his first day, he moves into an old apartment building where he soon becomes entangled in the lives of his kooky new neighbors, including a temperamental photographer and a self-absorbed aspiring actress. When he's not busy flirting with the ladies or learning to live on his own, would-be writer Jones divides his time between fending off queries from his alcoholic mother, penning letters to an absentee father, and indulging in an overactive fantasy life. An auto accident forces a reality check, however, nudging Jones to grow up and decide what he really wants.

Cast

Production
This is the second film in which Elizabeth Perkins plays Elijah Wood's mother, the first being Avalon, directed by Barry Levinson.

External links

2002 films
2002 romantic comedy films
American romantic comedy films
American teen comedy films
American coming-of-age comedy films
Nu Image films
Films shot in Vancouver
MoviePass Films films
Brightlight Pictures films
Canadian romantic comedy films
Canadian teen comedy films
Canadian coming-of-age comedy films
2000s English-language films
2000s American films
2000s Canadian films